Vikrama Urvashi or Urvasiyin Kadhal is a 1940 Indian, Tamil-language film directed by C. V. Raman. The film stars C. V. V. Panthulu and C. S. Sulochana.

Cast
The list is adapted from the database of Film News Anandan.
C. V. V. Panthulu
C. S. Sulochana
Kali N. Rathnam
C. T. Rajakantham
P. A. Rajamani
G. Ramanathan
P. R. Mangalam

Production
As was the custom of the day, the film had an alternate title Urvasiyin Kadhal.
The film was the debut as actor and singer for P. A. Periyanayaki who was in her early teens at that time. She later blossomed as an actress and more popularly as a playback singer.

Soundtrack
G. Ramanathan composed the music while the lyrics were penned by his elder brother G. Sundara Bhagavathar.

References

External links
 - song by P. A. Periyanayaki
 - song by P. A. Periyanayaki

Indian black-and-white films
1940s Tamil-language films
Films scored by G. Ramanathan